Chionophila (Snow lover) is a genus of plants in the family Plantaginaceae and the tribe Cheloneae.

Its native range is western central U.S.A. and is found in the states of Colorado, Idaho, Montana, New Mexico and Wyoming.

References

External links 

Plantaginaceae
Plantaginaceae genera